, also known as , is the first theatrical film of the anime series Kinnikuman. It was released in Japan on July 14, 1984 along with Choudenshi Bioman, Uchuu Keiji Shaider, and The Kabocha Wine. It is set after the 21st Choujin Olympics.

This was the first movie to feature Kōji Yada, who appears in all following movies (except the final two), and also the first to feature series creators Yudetamago in a cameo. Octopus Dragon, Harigorasu, and Ukon are all kaijū from the infamous "Roots Island" two-part story from the original manga that does not appear in recent reprints. Mouko-seijin is also a kaijū from the original manga, although these characters bear little resemblance to their manga counterparts. The movie's monster Gigasaurus does resemble the manga's Octopus Dragon.

Descendants of Ukon would appear in all following films (usually played by Yudetamago).

New characters

Plot
After winning the 21st Choujin Olympics, Kinnikuman plans to build his own theme park. As his friends and celebrities arrive, the sky grows dark and with a flash of lightning Kinnikuman's championship belt is gone. He then sees that it has been taken by Octopus Dragon III, who challenges him to take it back. Kinnikuman tries but fails and Mari is kidnapped. Despite his injuries, Kinnikuman is determined to go and reclaim his belt and Mari. Luckily, Terryman, Ramenman, Robin Mask, Warsman, Brocken Jr., and Rikishiman arrive to lend him a hand.

Upon arrival on Planet Metro, they are spotted by two minions of Octopus Dragon (series creators Yudetamago in a cameo). They first come across Harigorasu, who is guarding a log bridge. Rikishiman volunteers to fight him and eventually causes them both to fall over into the valley below. Although Rikishiman manages to grab hold of the wall of the valley, he tells Kinnikuman and the others to go on without him as it would take too much time to save him. When Kinnikuman refuses, he lets go of the wall and falls into the valley.

They next meet the ninjutsu Choujin Ukon and his minions. As they continue, Robin Mask and Warsman volunteer to take on AmeRug Boss and his minons so Kinnikuman and Terryman can continue. However, Warsman meets up with them again and tells of how Robin threw himself and several of the enemies into an erupting volcano. Warsman then ends up taking on another group of enemies by himself, urging Kinnikuman and Terryman to continue.

Kinnikuman and Terryman finally find Mari but are immediately challenged by Octopus Dragon to a tag match against himself and Mouko-seijin. Broadcast all over the universe, the fight takes place in a ring with electric ropes. The ropes are powered by a machine that Octopus Dragon's minion Gammalar turns off whenever his boss needs to use the ropes. After a fierce struggle, Terryman defeats Mouko-seijin with his trademark Calf Branding but is shot by Gammalar before he can help Kinnikuman. Kinnikuman remembers the sacrifices his friends have made for him and evokes the Kajiba no Kuso Djikara. He then defeats Octopus Dragon with the Fuu Rin Ka Zan followed by the Kinniku Buster.

Gammalar then tries to shoot Mari down into Gigasaurus' mouth, but Kinnikuman knock him away and catches Mari. With his last breath, Octopus Dragon releases Gigasaurus from his prison and the monster immediately goes after Kinnikuman and Mari. Kinnikuman is almost eaten by Gigasaurus but is saved by Ramenman and Rikishiman. He then manages to lure the beast into falling over the side of a cliff. Kinnikuman, Mari, the Idol Choujins, Meat, and Nachiguron then rest by watching the sunset. Kinnikuman begins to cry at the beautiful display of friendship he witnessed today, so Mari offers him her handkerchief. They almost kiss but are interrupted by a female dinosaur emerging from the ground beneath them and confessing her own feelings for Kinnikuman, ending the film on a comical note with all the characters laughing.

Songs
Opening Theme
"" by Akira Kushida

Closing Theme
"" by Akira Kamiya (Kinnikuman)

Insert Songs
"" by Tsutomu Arukawa
"" by Woo
"See You Again, Hero" by Akira Kamiya (Kinnikuman)

Cast

* For unknown reasons, Kōji Totani is uncredited for his appearance in this film.

External links
 
 

1984 anime films
1984 films
Anime films based on manga
Films directed by Takeshi Shirato
Kinnikuman films